Steyregg is a municipality in the district of Urfahr-Umgebung in the Austrian state of Upper Austria.

History
The town was once part of the territory owned by the Princes of Liechtenstein as a fiefdom, Lord of Steyregg was one of the family's titles.

Population

References

Cities and towns in Urfahr-Umgebung District